Libor Foltman (born 11 July 1948) is a Czech former skier. He competed in the Nordic combined event at the 1972 Winter Olympics.

References

External links
 

1948 births
Living people
Czech male Nordic combined skiers
Olympic Nordic combined skiers of Czechoslovakia
Nordic combined skiers at the 1972 Winter Olympics
People from Trutnov
Sportspeople from the Hradec Králové Region